Squash was contested from 10 December 2006 to 14 December 2006 at the 2006 Asian Games in Doha, Qatar. Competition consists of men's and women's singles competition with all matches to be played at the Khalifa International Tennis and Squash Complex.

Malaysia finished first in medal table, winning both gold medals.

Schedule

Medalists

Medal table

Participating nations
A total of 42 athletes from 16 nations competed in squash at the 2006 Asian Games:

References 

Results

External links

 
2006
2006 Asian Games events
A